"Champagne Dance" is a song by UK garage crew Pay As U Go. In April 2002, the single charted at number 13 on the UK Singles Chart. It remains the group's only charting hit single before they disbanded with members going on to join grime crew Roll Deep.

Track listings

12
A. "Champagne Dance" (Brown Acid Mix)
B1. "Champagne Dance" (Da Sticky Lick)
B2. "Champagne Dance" (Destruction Remix)

CD single
 "Champagne Dance" (Brown Acid Radio Edit)
 "Champagne Dance" (Da Sticky Lick)
 "Champagne Dance" (Destruction Remix)
 Champagne Dance Video

Charts

References 

2001 songs
2002 singles
UK garage songs
Songs written by Wiley (musician)
Sony Music UK singles